Nicole Rodrigues is an Indian entrepreneur. She is the founder and CEO of Dubai-based Diva Group of Companies. She launched Diva Modelling and Events in 2003. After the success of her modelling agency, the company branched out into real estate by starting Diva Holdings. In 2010, the company established NM Investments and further expanded its horizons by venturing into consulting and accounting services. By 2011, Rodrigues added two more business lines, Diva Laundry and Diva Salon. In 2015, she was recognised in the Outstanding Category at the Asia Pacific Entrepreneurship Awards. In 2014, Rodrigues was acknowledged as one of the Forbes Top Indian Leaders in the Arab World. She also won the CEO of the year at the CEO Awards in 2014. Today, Diva Group of companies is capitalizing on its home grown success and expanding its operations to Qatar, Kuwait, Doha, Bahrain, Turkey, India and Pakistan. As of March 2022, her net worth is estimated at USD 92 million.

Early life and education
Nicole Rodrigues was born and raised in Mumbai, India. At age 16, Rodrigues started her career in modeling. She participated in various inter-college fashion shows and was eventually discovered by Vikram Phadnis, a popular Indian fashion designer who launched her as a professional model. In the years to come, she appeared on the covers of various leading magazines like Femina and Health and Nutrition.

Career
In 1995, Rodrigues moved to Bahrain when she began working for Gulf Air. There she met, Henrik Larsen, and later moved to Copenhagen after their first child was born.

Personal life
Rodrigues has a son, Victor (14) and a daughter, Victoria (18) who are currently pursuing their education in UAE. She lives in Dubai.

Further reading
Pacesetters 2 (2013) by Meraj Rizvi
 Revealed: Arabian Business’ 50 Inspiring Female Business Leaders (2022)

References

External links
 Official website

21st-century Indian businesswomen
21st-century Indian businesspeople
1973 births
Living people
Businesspeople from Mumbai
Indian expatriates in the United Arab Emirates
Businesspeople from Dubai